Jimmie's Millions is a 1925 American silent action film directed by James P. Hogan and starring Richard Talmadge, Betty Francisco, and Charles Clary.

Plot
As described in a film magazine review, Jimmie Wicherly is named as heir to his uncle’s millions provided he reports promptly at a designated hour each day for three months. Jealous relatives attempt to get him out of the way, and trump up charges of murder against him. He proves the supposed dead man is alive and exposes the villain. He wins the  millions and the hand of an attractive young woman.

Cast

References

Bibliography
 Munden, Kenneth White. The American Film Institute Catalog of Motion Pictures Produced in the United States, Part 1. University of California Press, 1997.

External links
 

1925 films
1920s action films
1920s English-language films
American silent feature films
American action films
Films directed by James Patrick Hogan
American black-and-white films
Film Booking Offices of America films
1920s American films
Silent action films